Sir Ronald William Graham  (24 July 1870 – 26 January 1949) was a British diplomat and the British Ambassador to Italy from 1921 to 1933.

Early life
Graham was born in London 24 July 1870 the eldest son of Sir Henry John Lowndes Graham and was educated at Eton College.

Diplomatic service
In 1892 Graham joined the British Diplomatic Service with his first foreign post at Paris. In 1902, he was promoted to first secretary and worked at the Eastern Department of the Foreign Office, before moving to Cairo as a Counsellor.

After a period as Minister at the Hague, he was sworn into Privy Council in 1921 and appointed Ambassador to Italy. He was the British representative during the Fascist Revolution of 1922 when Benito Mussolini came to power. Graham retired in November 1933 and became a trustee of the British Museum from 1937.

Personal life

Graham married Lady Sybil Brodrick, the daughter of the Earl of Midleton in January 1912. Lady Sybil, who was Maid of honour to Queen Mary from 1911 to 1912, was the sister of George Brodrick, 2nd Earl of Midleton.

His wife died six months after Graham retired and they had no children. Graham died at his home in London aged 78 in 1949.

References

1870 births
1949 deaths
Knights Grand Cross of the Order of the Bath
Knights Grand Cross of the Order of St Michael and St George
Knights Grand Cross of the Royal Victorian Order
Civil servants from London
Ambassadors of the United Kingdom to Italy
People educated at Eton College
Members of the Privy Council of the United Kingdom
Grand Officers of the Order of Saints Maurice and Lazarus